Srinivasa Ramanujan (1887 – 1920) is the eponym of all of the topics listed below.

Mathematics
Brocard–Ramanujan Diophantine equation
Dougall–Ramanujan identity
Landau–Ramanujan constant
Ramanujan's congruences
Hardy–Ramanujan number
Hardy–Ramanujan theorem
Hardy–Ramanujan asymptotic formula
Ramanujan identity
Ramanujan machine
Ramanujan–Nagell equation
Ramanujan–Peterssen conjecture
Ramanujan–Soldner constant
Ramanujan summation
Ramanujan theta function
Ramanujan graph
Ramanujan's tau function
Ramanujan's ternary quadratic form
Ramanujan prime
Ramanujan's constant
Ramanujan's lost notebook
Ramanujan's master theorem
Ramanujan's sum
Rogers–Ramanujan identities
Rogers–Ramanujan continued fraction
Ramanujan–Sato series
Ramanujan magic square

Journals
Hardy–Ramanujan Journal
Journal of the Ramanujan Mathematical Society
Ramanujan Journal

Institutions and societies
Ramanujan College, University of Delhi
Ramanujan Institute for Advanced Study in Mathematics
Srinivasa Ramanujan Institute of Technology
Ramanujan Mathematical Society
 Srinivasa Ramanujan Centre at Sastra University  https://sas.sastra.edu/src/
Srinivasa Ramanujan Concept School
Ramanujan IT City, Chennai
Ramanujan Hostel, Indian Institute of Management, Calcutta
Srinivisa Ramanujan Library, Indian Institute of Science Education and Research, Pune

Prizes and awards
Srinivasa Ramanujan Medal
SASTRA Ramanujan Prize
DST-ICTP-IMU Ramanujan Prize
Ramanujan Prize, University of Madras

Places
Ramanujan IT City, Chennai
Ramanujan Math Park, Chittoor, Andhra Pradesh, India

References

Ramanujan